A Bossche bol (Dutch for 'Ball from Den Bosch') – or just called chocoladebol ('chocolate ball') in its city of origin – is a pastry from the Dutch city of 'sHertogenbosch. It is effectively a large profiterole (cream puff), about 12 cm (5 in.) in diameter (i.e., somewhat larger than a tennis ball), filled with whipped cream and coated entirely or almost entirely with (usually dark) chocolate fondant icing.

Eating

Bossche bollen (chocoladebollen) are usually eaten as an accompaniment to coffee, etc., rather than as a dessert.

They are traditionally eaten with the fingers, which can be quite messy. The best way to avoid spillage is by eating the pastry upside down, so that the hard layer of chocolate serves as a bottom. It is also possible (though frowned upon by traditionalists) to use a knife and fork.

History

Even before the start of the 20th century, a predecessor of the Bossche Bol was being sold in Den Bosch by a baker named Lambermont, who had a store in a building called "De Kat" on the Vischstraat at number 61b. The ball made by Lambermont resembled a moorkop and was filled with custard.

In 1920 a baker from The Hague called Henri van der Zijde opened a shop in the same street at number 25, and invented a variation filled with whipped cream and covered with real chocolate, which his heirs see as the first real Bossche Bol. Later in the twenties Lambermont started selling a chocolate ball much like this one.

The name "Bossche bol" only became common once the pastry became popular outside of the city.

The exact recipe varies between bakers, although the recipe that is now acknowledged as the "real Bossche Bol" is the one made and sold by the confectionery Jan de Groot.

Similar foods
There is a version of the Bossche Bol twice the size, called a reuzenbol ("giant ball").

A similar, slightly smaller, common Dutch pastry is the Moorkop — a profiterole which is usually not glazed with chocolate per se, but instead with a chocolate-flavoured glaze, made with cocoa powder. Often a puff of whipped cream is put on top of a moorkop. 

Many other regional chocolate-coated, cream-filled treats, such as the German Schokokuss exist. These are much smaller, factory-made and sold in unrefrigerated packs. Those who choose to, can generally eat them whole, in a single bite.

These were originally marketed as 'Negerzoenen' ('Negro(id) Kisses'), but after complaints calling this racist, the manufacturer rebranded them simply as '(Buys) Zoenen' ('Buys Kisses') in 2006.
By contrast, the common 'Moorkoppen', – litterally: 'Moors heads'  – were not (yet) criticised the same way, and continue to be sold, name unchanged.

See also

 List of choux pastry dishes
 List of pastries

External links

 Recipes: by Koos Manders
 Soesgebak: moorkoppen en Bossche bollen (Dutch language)
 Bossche bol
 Learn more about the Bossche bol: Bossche bol tour 

Dutch pastries
Culture of North Brabant
's-Hertogenbosch
Choux pastry
Chocolate-covered foods